WDL may stand for:
WDL Aviation, a German airline (subsidiary of WDL Group)
Watch Dogs: Legion, a 2020 video game developed by Ubisoft Toronto
Western Desert language, an Australian dialect cluster also known as Wati
White Defence League, a former British far-right political group
Woodlands MRT station, Singapore; station abbreviation WDL
World Digital Library, an international digital library operated by UNESCO and the United States Library of Congress
Workers' Defense League, a former American socialist organization devoted to promoting labor rights